Grande Soeur Island, also called Big Sister, East Sister, is an island in the Seychelles archipelago, Located north of La Digue.
It is part of Iles Soeurs with Petite Soeur. It is a granitic island covered with tropical forests. 
The island is privately owned.

History
In the 20th century there was a small coconut plantation on the island. in 2005 the island, which was privately owned, was bought by hotel Château de Feuilles from Praslin Island. It is visited by their guests, especially for diving. recently the hotel have built a platform for helicopters, and several villas for overnight stay with a staff house.

Gallery

References 

Islands of La Digue and Inner Islands
Private islands of Seychelles